Montequinto is a station of the Seville Metro on line 1 named after the neighborhood of Montequinto in the municipality Dos Hermanas, Seville. It is located in the instesection of Montequinto Av. and Ferrara St.. Montequinto is an underground type station situated between Condequinto and Europa on the same line. It was opened on 23 November 2009.

See also
 List of Seville metro stations

References

External links 
  Official site.
 History, construction details and maps.

Seville Metro stations
Railway stations in Spain opened in 2009